Conservative and Unionist Central Office v Burrell [1981] EWCA Civ 2 is an English trusts law case ruling on the "beneficiary principle". The Inland Revenue sought to define the party, a mixed-money, common-object body with regular spending for political purposes, as an unincorporated association. The direct subject matter was on the applicability of corporation tax, which was confirmed to apply to unincorporated associations but that the set-up of the party and its rules were not such an instance. The party was a sui generis body (body of its own class) meaning a lex specialis (set of special laws) should apply.

Facts
The Inland Revenue argued that the contributions of members of the Conservative Party (formally, the Conservative and Unionist Party) took effect as an accretion to the funds (legally termed "mixed fund") which placed investments to make extra self-income, essentially controlled by the party leader due to rules in place voted on by the members and were thus the subject matter of a contract, which safeguarded and determined what happened with the members' funds. It argued that if that is so, then like a much smaller inter-members association where funds can revert with much more ease, such corporation tax should be payable.

Vinelott J at first instance in the Chancery Division of the High Court (Conservative and Unionist Central Office v Burrell [1980] 3 All ER 42) held that each contributor enters a contract with the treasurer, who undertakes to use the subscription for the association's purposes. Breach would mean liability in contract.

Judgment
The Court of Appeal held there was no contract which connected the branches of the party with the members tightly among themselves (inter se), so the Re Recher analysis could not apply. Brightman LJ said donations to political parties give a mandate or authority as an agent to the party treasurer to add the party's funds. This must be used for party purposes. The mandate is irrevocable, but (essentially of relevance to other scenarios) the contributor has a remedy to restrain misapplication of money unless their own contribution had been spent already (the moment of spending and any misapplication judged by ordinary accounting principles). It was accepted that the same kind of temporary rescission and rare means of restraint (whether footed on contract or agency) could not apply for a dead person. Such a person could have authorised their will's personal representatives (executives) to do so.

Lord Justice Lawton, referring to the Income and Corporation Taxes Act 1970, section 526 said:

See also

English trusts law

Notes and references
Footnotes

References

External links
 Conservative and Unionist Central Office v Burrell (HM Inspector of Taxes) (1981) EWCA Civ 2 (10 December 1981)

English trusts case law
History of the Conservative Party (UK)
1981 in British law
1981 in case law
Court of Appeal (England and Wales) cases